Aandhiyan (English: Storms) is a 1990 Hindi film directed by David Dhawan. It stars Shatrughan Sinha, Prosenjit Chatterjee, Madhushree and Mumtaz in her comeback role after 13 years. The film marked Bengali actor Prosenjit Chatterjee's Hindi film debut. Although this film was Mumtaz's comeback movie, it is also her final film.

Plot
The story revolves around Shakuntala (Mumtaz) and Dushyant (Shatrughan Sinha). Dushyan't father would not approve of their marriage because Shakuntala was from a poor background. The movie shows the Dushyant's struggle to decide whether to stay with his wife or his father.

Cast
 Shatrughan Sinha as Dushyant
 Mumtaz as Shakuntala
 Prosenjit Chatterjee as Vikram "Vicky"
 Madhushree as Kiran
 Saeed Jaffrey as Shakuntala's Father
 Om Shivpuri as Dushyant's Father
 Anil Dhawan as Vikram's lawyer
 Satyen Kappu as Judge

Music
Anjaan wrote all the songs.

"Phir Dil Ne Woh Chot Khayi" - Kumar Sanu
"Duniya Mein Tere Siva" - Anuradha Paudwal, Udit Narayan
"Ye Wada Karle Wada" - Manhar Udhas, Anuradha Paudwal
"Meri Maa Ne Bataya Hai Yahi Mujhko Sikhaya Hai" - Shabbir Kumar
"Ole Ole" - Rajkumar Bafna, Falguni
"Kya Mil Gayi Dusri" - Falguni
"Duniya Mein Tere Siva(Sad)" - Anuradha Paudwal
"Ole Ole" - Anuradha Paudwal, Udit Narayan

References

External links
 
 

1990 films
1990s Hindi-language films
Films directed by David Dhawan
Films scored by Bappi Lahiri
Indian drama films
1990 drama films
Hindi-language drama films
Indian remakes of Pakistani films